In geometry, a geodesic is a curve representing in some sense the shortest path (arc) between two points in a surface, or more generally in a Riemannian manifold. The term also has meaning in any  differentiable manifold with a connection. It is a generalization of the notion of a "straight line".

The noun geodesic and the adjective geodetic come from geodesy, the science of measuring the size and shape of Earth, though many of the underlying principles can be applied to any ellipsoidal geometry. In the original sense, a geodesic was the shortest route between two points on the Earth's surface. For a spherical Earth, it is a segment of a great circle (see also great-circle distance).  The term has since been generalized to more abstract mathematical spaces; for example, in graph theory, one might consider a geodesic between two vertices/nodes of a graph.

In a Riemannian manifold or submanifold, geodesics are characterised by the property of having vanishing geodesic curvature. More generally, in the presence of an affine connection, a geodesic is defined to be a curve whose tangent vectors remain parallel if they are transported along it. Applying this to the Levi-Civita connection of a Riemannian metric recovers the previous notion.

Geodesics are of particular importance in general relativity.  Timelike geodesics in general relativity describe the motion of free falling test particles.

Introduction
A locally shortest path between two given points in a curved space, assumed to be a Riemannian manifold, can be defined by using the equation for the length of a curve (a function f from an open interval of R to the space), and then minimizing this length between the points using the calculus of variations. This has some minor technical problems because there is an infinite-dimensional space of different ways to parameterize the shortest path. It is simpler to restrict the set of curves to those that are parameterized "with constant speed" 1, meaning that  the distance from f(s) to f(t) along the curve equals |s−t|. Equivalently, a different quantity may be used, termed the energy of the curve; minimizing the energy leads to the same equations for a geodesic (here "constant velocity" is a consequence of minimization). Intuitively, one can understand this second formulation by noting that an elastic band stretched between two points will contract its width, and in so doing will minimize its energy.  The resulting shape of the band is a geodesic.

It is possible that several different curves between two points minimize the distance, as is the case for two diametrically opposite points on a sphere. In such a case, any of these curves is a geodesic.

A contiguous segment of a geodesic is again a geodesic.

In general, geodesics are not the same as "shortest curves" between two points, though the two concepts are closely related. The difference is that geodesics are only locally the shortest distance between points, and are parameterized with "constant speed". Going the "long way round" on a great circle between two points on a sphere is a geodesic but not the shortest path between the points. The map  from the unit interval on the real number line to itself gives the shortest path between 0 and 1, but is not a geodesic because the velocity of the corresponding motion of a point is not constant.

Geodesics are commonly seen in the study of Riemannian geometry and more generally metric geometry. In general relativity, geodesics in spacetime describe the motion of point particles under the influence of gravity alone. In particular, the path taken by a falling rock, an orbiting satellite, or the shape of a planetary orbit are all geodesics in curved spacetime. More generally, the topic of sub-Riemannian geometry deals with the paths that objects may take when they are not free, and their movement is constrained in various ways.

This article presents the mathematical formalism involved in defining, finding, and proving the existence of geodesics, in the case of Riemannian manifolds. The article Levi-Civita connection discusses the more general case of a pseudo-Riemannian manifold and geodesic (general relativity) discusses the special case of general relativity in greater detail.

Examples

The most familiar examples are the straight lines in Euclidean geometry. On a  sphere, the images of geodesics are the  great circles. The shortest path from point A to point B on a sphere is given by the shorter arc of the great circle passing through A and B. If A and B are antipodal points, then there are infinitely many shortest paths between them.  Geodesics on an ellipsoid behave in a more complicated way than on a sphere; in particular, they are not closed in general (see figure).

Triangles

A geodesic triangle is formed by the geodesics joining each pair out of three points on a given surface. On the sphere, the geodesics are great circle arcs, forming a spherical triangle.

Metric geometry
In metric geometry, a geodesic is a curve which is everywhere locally a distance minimizer. More precisely, a curve  from an interval I of the reals to the metric space M is a geodesic if there is a constant  such that for any  there is a neighborhood J of t in I such that for any  we have

This generalizes the notion of geodesic for Riemannian manifolds. However, in metric geometry the geodesic considered is often equipped with natural parameterization, i.e. in the above identity v = 1 and

If the last equality is satisfied for all , the geodesic is called a minimizing geodesic or shortest path.

In general, a metric space may have no geodesics, except constant curves. At the other extreme, any two points in a length metric space are joined by a minimizing sequence of rectifiable paths, although this minimizing sequence need not converge to a geodesic.

Riemannian geometry
In a Riemannian manifold M with metric tensor g, the length L of a continuously differentiable curve γ : [a,b] → M is defined by

The distance d(p, q) between two points p and q of M is defined as the infimum of the length taken over all continuous, piecewise continuously differentiable curves γ : [a,b] → M such that γ(a) = p and γ(b) = q. In Riemannian geometry, all geodesics are locally distance-minimizing paths, but the converse is not true. In fact, only paths that are both locally distance minimizing and parameterized proportionately to arc-length are geodesics. Another equivalent way of defining geodesics on a Riemannian manifold, is to define them as the minima of the following action or energy functional

All minima of E are also minima of L, but L is a bigger set since paths that are minima of L can be arbitrarily re-parameterized (without changing their length), while minima of E cannot.
For a piecewise  curve (more generally, a  curve), the Cauchy–Schwarz inequality gives

with equality if and only if  is equal to a constant a.e.; the path should be travelled at constant speed. It happens that minimizers of  also minimize , because they turn out to be affinely parameterized, and the inequality is an equality. The usefulness of this approach is that the problem of seeking minimizers of E is a more robust variational problem. In contrast, "minimizers" of the functional  are generally not very regular, because arbitrary reparameterizations are allowed.

The Euler–Lagrange equations of motion for the functional E are then given in local coordinates by

where  are the Christoffel symbols of the metric.  This is the geodesic equation, discussed below.

Calculus of variations

Techniques of the classical calculus of variations can be applied to examine the energy functional E.  The first variation of energy is defined in local coordinates by

The critical points of the first variation are precisely the geodesics.  The second variation is defined by

In an appropriate sense, zeros of the second variation along a geodesic γ arise along Jacobi fields.  Jacobi fields are thus regarded as variations through geodesics.

By applying variational techniques from classical mechanics, one can also regard geodesics as Hamiltonian flows.  They are solutions of the associated Hamilton equations, with (pseudo-)Riemannian metric taken as Hamiltonian.

Affine geodesics

A geodesic on a smooth manifold  M with an affine connection  ∇ is defined as a curve γ(t) such that parallel transport along the curve preserves the tangent vector to the curve, so

More precisely, in order to define the covariant derivative of  it is necessary first to extend  to a continuously differentiable vector field in an open set.

Using local coordinates on M, we can write the geodesic equation (using the summation convention) as

This is an ordinary differential equation for the coordinates. It has a unique solution, given an initial position and an initial velocity. Therefore, from the point of view of classical mechanics, geodesics can be thought of as trajectories of free particles in a manifold. Indeed, the equation  means that the acceleration vector of the curve has no components in the direction of the surface (and therefore it is perpendicular to the tangent plane of the surface at each point of the curve). So, the motion is completely determined by the bending of the surface. This is also the idea of general relativity where particles move on geodesics and the bending is caused by gravity.

Existence and uniqueness
The local existence and uniqueness theorem for geodesics states that geodesics on a smooth manifold with an affine connection exist, and are unique.  More precisely:

For any point p in M and for any vector V in TpM (the tangent space to M at p) there exists a unique geodesic  : I → M such that
 and

where I is a maximal open interval in R containing 0.

The proof of this theorem follows from the theory of  ordinary differential equations, by noticing that the geodesic equation is a second-order ODE. Existence and uniqueness then follow from the Picard–Lindelöf theorem for the solutions of ODEs with prescribed initial conditions. γ depends smoothly on both p and V.

In general, I may not be all of R as for example for an open disc in R2. Any  extends to all of  if and only if  is geodesically complete.

Geodesic flow
Geodesic flow is a local R-action on the tangent bundle TM of a manifold M defined in the following way

where t ∈ R, V ∈ TM and  denotes the geodesic with initial data . Thus,  (V) = exp(tV) is the exponential map of the vector tV.  A closed orbit of the geodesic flow corresponds to a closed geodesic on M.

On a (pseudo-)Riemannian manifold, the geodesic flow is identified with a Hamiltonian flow on the cotangent bundle.  The Hamiltonian is then given by the inverse of the (pseudo-)Riemannian metric, evaluated against the canonical one-form. In particular the flow preserves the (pseudo-)Riemannian metric , i.e.

 

In particular, when V is a unit vector,  remains unit speed throughout, so the geodesic flow is tangent to the unit tangent bundle.  Liouville's theorem implies invariance of a kinematic measure on the unit tangent bundle.

Geodesic spray

The geodesic flow defines a family of curves in the tangent bundle. The derivatives of these curves define a vector field  on the total space of the tangent bundle, known as the geodesic spray.

More precisely, an affine connection gives rise to a splitting of the double tangent bundle TTM into horizontal and vertical bundles:

The geodesic spray is the unique horizontal vector field W satisfying

at each point v ∈ TM; here π∗ : TTM → TM denotes the pushforward (differential) along the projection π : TM → M associated to the tangent bundle.

More generally, the same construction allows one to construct a vector field for any Ehresmann connection on the tangent bundle.  For the resulting vector field to be a spray (on the deleted tangent bundle TM \ {0}) it is enough that the connection be equivariant under positive rescalings: it need not be linear.  That is, (cf. Ehresmann connection#Vector bundles and covariant derivatives) it is enough that the horizontal distribution satisfy

for every X ∈ TM \ {0} and λ > 0.  Here d(Sλ) is the pushforward along the scalar homothety   A particular case of a non-linear connection arising in this manner is that associated to a Finsler manifold.

Affine and projective geodesics
Equation is invariant under affine reparameterizations; that is, parameterizations of the form

where a and b are constant real numbers. Thus apart from specifying a certain class of embedded curves, the geodesic equation also determines a preferred class of parameterizations on each of the curves.

An affine connection is determined by its family of affinely parameterized geodesics, up to torsion .  The torsion itself does not, in fact, affect the family of geodesics, since the geodesic equation depends only on the symmetric part of the connection.  More precisely, if  are two connections such that the difference tensor

is skew-symmetric, then  and  have the same geodesics, with the same affine parameterizations.

Geodesics without a particular parameterization are described by a projective connection.

Computational methods
Efficient solvers for the minimal geodesic problem on surfaces posed as eikonal equations have been proposed by Kimmel and others.

Ribbon Test 

A Ribbon "Test" is a way of finding a geodesic on a physical surface. The idea is to fit a bit of paper around a straight line (a ribbon) onto a curved surface as closely as possible without stretching or squishing the ribbon (without changing its internal geometry).

For example, when a ribbon is wound as a ring around a cone, the ribbon would not lie on the cone's surface but stick out, so that circle is not a geodesic on the cone. If the ribbon is adjusted so that all its parts touch the cone's surface, it would give an approximation to a geodesic.

Applications

Geodesics serve as the basis to calculate:
 geodesic airframes; see geodesic airframe or geodetic airframe
 geodesic structures – for example geodesic domes
 horizontal distances on or near Earth; see Earth geodesics
 mapping images on surfaces, for rendering; see UV mapping
 particle motion in molecular dynamics (MD) computer simulations
 robot motion planning (e.g., when painting car parts); see Shortest path problem

See also

 
 
 
 Differential geometry of surfaces
 Geodesic circle

Notes

References

Further reading

. See chapter 2.
. See section 2.7.
. See section 1.4.
.
. See section 87.

.  Note especially pages 7 and 10.
.
. See chapter 3.

External links 

 Geodesics Revisited — Introduction to geodesics including two ways of derivation of the equation of geodesic with applications in geometry (geodesic on a sphere and on a torus), mechanics (brachistochrone) and optics (light beam in inhomogeneous medium).
 Totally geodesic submanifold at the Manifold Atlas

Differential geometry